Giuseppe Fornito (born 6 September 1994) is an Italian footballer who plays as a central midfielder for  club Gelbison.

Club career

Napoli
Coming from the youth ranks of Napoli, he was called to the first team for a match in the Europa League against PSV Eindhoven on December 6, 2012.

Delfino Pescara
In July 2013 Giuseppe Fornito went on loan to Pescara becoming the second Napoli player in two years to play for the club on loan after the success of Lorenzo Insigne while he was playing there on a loan spell.

Catania
On 31 August 2017, he joined Catania outright and was given the number 18 shirt.

Rende
On 7 January 2020 he signed with Rende.

Serie D
On 17 September 2020 he moved to Savoia.

National team
Giuseppe Fornito has played for the Italy U16, Italy U17 and Italy U19 teams.

References

 calciomercato.napoli.it
 generazioneditalenti.forumfree.it

External links
 Ficha en la web del SSC Napoli
 calciomercato.napoli.it
 

1994 births
People from Trebisacce
Living people
Italian footballers
Association football midfielders
Italy youth international footballers
S.S.C. Napoli players
Delfino Pescara 1936 players
Cosenza Calcio players
Rimini F.C. 1912 players
A.C.R. Messina players
Trapani Calcio players
Catania S.S.D. players
Paganese Calcio 1926 players
U.S. Savoia 1908 players
S.S.C. Giugliano players
Serie B players
Serie C players
Sportspeople from the Province of Cosenza
Footballers from Calabria